Ingeborg Schmitz (born 22 April 1922) is a German former swimmer who competed in the 1936 Summer Olympics.

In the 1936 Olympics she won a silver medal in the 4 × 100 m freestyle relay event. She was also fifth in her first round heat of 100 m freestyle event and did not advance.

External links

1922 births
Living people
German female swimmers
Olympic swimmers of Germany
Swimmers at the 1936 Summer Olympics
Olympic silver medalists for Germany
German female freestyle swimmers
Medalists at the 1936 Summer Olympics
Olympic silver medalists in swimming
20th-century German women